Broadwater Park is a cricket ground during the summer, and football ground through winter, located in Farncombe, Surrey.

The first recorded match on the ground was in 1827, when the ground hosted a match between East and West Sussex. The ground held a single first-class match in 1854 when Surrey played Nottinghamshire. In constant use throughout both the 19th and 20th centuries, the ground today is the home venue of Farncombe Cricket Club.
and Farncombe Wanderers Cricket Club.

The Broadwater parkrun, a five-kilometre organised run/jog/walk, takes place every Saturday at 9am in the park.

The lake, at the east edge of the park, is leased by Godalming Angling Society.

References

External links
Broadwater Park on CricketArchive
Broadwater Park on Cricinfo

Cricket grounds in Surrey
Surrey County Cricket Club grounds
Godalming
Sports venues completed in 1827
1827 establishments in England